Kazanka is a rural locality (a selo) and the administrative center of Kazansky Selsoviet of Seryshevsky District, Amur Oblast, Russia. The population was 450 as of 2018. There are 8 streets.

Geography 
Kazanka is located on the Zeya River, 28 km west of Seryshevo (the district's administrative centre) by road. Sretenka is the nearest rural locality.

References 

Rural localities in Seryshevsky District